This is a list of wars that occurred in the southern Low Countries between 1560 and 1829.

Unlike the 'Northern Netherlands', where a set of united provinces and cities proclaimed its independence in 1581 and would become the Dutch Republic in 1588, the southern Low Countries would remain dependent territories throughout this time. These non-sovereign territories included the Habsburg-owned Southern Netherlands (Spanish Netherlands until 1715, Austrian Netherlands until 1795), the Prince-Bishopric of Liège (until 1795), the Princely Abbey of Stavelot-Malmedy (until 1794), the Prince-Bishopric of Cambrésis and the Imperial City of Cambray (until 1678), the Principality of Sedan (until 1651), the Duchy of Bouillon (until 1795), and some western parts of the Duchy of Jülich (until 1795). Aside from these, there were various other small political entities such as the County of Enghien (until 1569), the Imperial Lordship of Kessenich (until 1784), the Duchy of Aarschot, the Duchy of Hoogstraten, the County of Horne, the Double Lordship of Maastricht, the Redemptiedorpen, the County of the Vroenhof (all until 1795), and so on. During the Brabant and Liège Revolutions (1789–1791), the United Belgian States and Liège Republic briefly achieved de facto independence, but remained unrecognised before the Habsburgs restored their power, and French Revolutionary armies soon conquered all the southern Low Countries and annexed them into the French First Republic in 1795. Most of the Low Countries were unified in 1815 as the newly created United Kingdom of the Netherlands under the House of Orange-Nassau, in personal union with the newly created Grand Duchy of Luxembourg, until the Belgian Revolution broke out in 1830.

 For earlier wars, see List of wars in the Low Countries until 1560.
 For simultaneous wars in the Northern Netherlands, see List of wars involving the Netherlands (1560–present)
 For subsequent wars in the southern Low Countries, see
List of wars involving Belgium (1830–present), from the Belgian Revolution onwards
List of wars involving Luxembourg (1890–present).

Notes

References 

Low Countries
Wars
Europe-related lists
Military history of Europe